The Barbours Cut Container Terminal, or simply the Barbours Cut Terminal, is a major deep water port in the Greater Houston area in the U.S. state of Texas. It is part of one of the world's busiest ports by cargo tonnage.

Geography
Barbours Cut is situated along the Barbours Cut Ship Channel, between La Porte and Morgan's Point, Texas. This channel, located at the mouth of Buffalo Bayou on Galveston Bay, is itself a tributary to the larger Houston Ship Channel, which runs from Houston, through the bay, to the Gulf of Mexico.

The terminal is located near the Battleground Industrial District, a major industrial complex in the jurisdiction of La Porte.

History
Opened in 1977, the Barbours Cut Terminal was built at a cost of US$53 million (US$ in today's terms). The new terminal had a distinct geographical advantage over the old Turning Basin terminal. Whereas Turning Basin, situated upriver at the navigational head of Buffalo Bayou, is 6 hours or more from the Gulf, Barbours Cut requires only three hours travel time.

In 2007 the terminal handled 15.4 million short tons (17.0 million metric tons) of cargo including more than one million cargo containers. The terminal both directly and indirectly contributes thousands of jobs to the Galveston Bay Area and is a key factor in the economy of Greater Houston.

Description
Part of the larger Port of Houston complex, Barbours Cut is the largest of the terminals and the first port in Texas to handle standardized cargo containers.

The facilities at Barbours Cut include a cruise ship terminal. Until 2007 Norwegian Cruise Line ran cruises from this terminal but currently there are no cruise lines operating from the terminal.

Environmental issues
Barbours Cut was the first port in the United States to implement the ISO 14001 environmental management standard, a rigorous set of requirements for minimizing a business' effects on the environment. Nevertheless, the Natural Resources Defense Council, an environmental advocacy group, has given Barbours Cut and the Port of Houston a grade of "F" citing "its deplorable treatment of local residents and its few noteworthy programs to reduce the effects of its operations on air and water quality."

See also

 Bayport Terminal
 Port of Galveston
 Port of Houston
 Port of Texas City

Notes

Further reading

External links
 Port of Houston: Barbours Cut Terminal

Galveston Bay Area
Greater Houston
Ports and harbors of Texas
La Porte, Texas
Gulf of Mexico
Transportation buildings and structures in Harris County, Texas